Schlosstheater Moers  is a theatre in Moers, North Rhine-Westphalia, Germany.

Theatres in North Rhine-Westphalia